

Station List

Sa

Sc-Se

Sha-Shim

Shin

Shio-Shu

So-Su

S